The Blocked Trail is a 1943 American Western "Three Mesquiteers" B-movie directed by Elmer Clifton and starring  Bob Steele, Tom Tyler, and Jimmie Dodd.

Cast 
 Bob Steele as Tucson Smith
 Tom Tyler as Stony Brooke
 Jimmie Dodd as Lullaby Joslin
 Helen Deverell as Ann Martin
 George J. Lewis as Freddy (as George Lewis)
 Walter Soderling as 'Mad' Martin
 Charles Miller as Frank Nolan (as Charkes F. Miller)
 Kermit Maynard as Henchman Reese
 Pierce Lyden as Henchman Rankin
 Carl Mathews as Henchman Lon
 Hal Price as Sheriff Pillsbury
 Budd Buster as Deputy 'Bets' McGee

References

External links 

1943 films
1943 Western (genre) films
American Western (genre) films
1940s English-language films
American black-and-white films
Films directed by Elmer Clifton
Republic Pictures films
Three Mesquiteers films
1940s American films